Ode Burrell Jr. (September 15, 1939 – February 28, 2009) was an American football player.  A halfback, he played high school football at Durant, Mississippi college football at Mississippi State University, where he was the MVP of the Liberty Bowl and the Blue-Gray Game. He played professionally in the American Football League (AFL) for the Houston Oilers from 1964 through 1969. During his career he was a versatile player. In his best season, 1965, he rushed for 528 yards, caught 55 passes for 650 yards, and returned punts and kickoffs for an additional 241 yards. He was an American Football League All-Star in 1965. After retiring from the NFL, Burrell coached at numerous high schools including Bogalusa High School, Stone County in Wiggins, Mississippi, Vancleave High School, and St. Stanislaus High School. He also coached at two community colleges, Holmes Community College and Gulf Coast Community College. Burrell died February 28, 2009, of complications from diabetes.

See also
 List of American Football League players

References

External links
 

1939 births
2009 deaths
People from Goodman, Mississippi
Players of American football from Mississippi
American football halfbacks
American football punters
American football wide receivers
Holmes Bulldogs football players
Mississippi State Bulldogs football players
Houston Oilers players
American Football League players
American Football League All-Star players
Deaths from diabetes